Tree Top, Inc. was the first grower-owned fruit processing cooperative in the United States. 1,100 apple and pear growers in Washington, Idaho, and Oregon own the cooperative, with the majority of the growers from Washington.

History
Tree Top was founded by Bill Charbonneau, who purchased an apple processing plant in Selah, Washington, after moving from southern California with his family. In the 1950s, Charbonneau developed a brand of apple juice. A contest held among his employees led to choosing the name "Tree Top" due to the perception that the highest quality fruit grows at the tops of trees. A handful of orchardists purchased Tree Top from Bill Charbonneau in 1960 and with the purchase, the growers bought the right to the first clear apple juice process developed and its facilities. In 2008, the cooperative had nearly 1,000 grower/owners in Washington, Oregon and Idaho and along with its subsidiary, Sabroso Company, produce a wide array of fruit-based products and ingredients, including Tree Top apple juice, apple sauce, and fresh sliced apples.

In 2010, the Sabroso Company was integrated into Tree Top's cooperative structure, and the cooperative is now the producer of the widest array of fruit products from a single source. Eight fruit processing facilities located along the western United States near the orchards and field of local growers allow the company to use fresh fruits and berries such as strawberries, apricots and grapes to create purées, fruit preps, and nectar in addition to the apple and pear products and ingredients for which it has been known. Tree Top's fruit products are sold throughout the Western United States and distributed by others in many other countries.

References

External links
Official Tree Top website

Agricultural cooperatives in the United States
Apple production
Agricultural marketing cooperatives
Food and drink companies of the United States
Juice brands
Companies based in Yakima County, Washington
American companies established in 1960
Food and drink companies established in 1960
1960 establishments in Washington (state)
Agriculture in Idaho
Agriculture in Oregon
Agriculture in Washington (state)
Economy of the Northwestern United States